Aung Thu (born 9 June 1966) is a Burmese politician who currently serves as a member of parliament in the Mandalay Region Hluttaw for Wundwin № 2 Constituency. He is a member of the National League for Democracy.

Early life
Aung Thu was born on 9 June 1966 in Tesu Village, Wundwin Township, Mandalay Region, Myanmar parents to Htun Kyaing and his wife Hla Nyunt. He graduated B.Ecom from Yangon University of Economics.

Political career
In the 2015 Myanmar general election, he contested the Mandalay Region Hluttaw from Wundwin Township № 2 parliamentary constituency. He is currently serves as a member of Mandalay Region Parliament's Transport, Communications and Construction Committee.

References

Members of Pyithu Hluttaw
National League for Democracy politicians
1966 births
Living people
People from Mandalay Region